"Nails in My Feet" is a song by rock group Crowded House. It was the second single released from the group's fourth studio album, Together Alone.

Track listings
In the UK, a two disc CD set was made available separately. Disc one was released in a double case, while disc two was sold in a sleeve to insert into the case with disc one. "Four Seasons in One Day" recorded at the parking lot of Capitol Records, Hollywood, 10 July 1991. "You Can Touch" and "I Am in Love" previously unreleased and were later released on the Crowded House rarities album Afterglow.

UK CD1
 "Nails in My Feet" – 3:39
 "You Can Touch" – 3:46
 "Zen Roxy" (instrumental) – 6:42

UK CD2
 "Nails in My Feet" – 3:39
 "I Am in Love" – 4:32
 "Four Seasons in One Day" (live, Capitol records Parking lot show, 10 July 1991) – 3:29

UK 7-inch single
 "Nails in My Feet" – 3:39
 "Don't Dream It's Over" (live, The Roxy, Los Angeles, 24 February 1987)

Dutch CD
 "Nails in My Feet" – 3:39
 "I Am in Love" – 4:32

Australian VHS single
 "Nails in My Feet"
 "Distant Sun"
 Footage from the Together Alone recording session

Charts

References

Crowded House songs
1993 singles
1993 songs
Capitol Records singles
Songs written by Neil Finn